Events from the year 1759 in Scotland.

Incumbents

Law officers 
 Lord Advocate – Robert Dundas the younger
 Solicitor General for Scotland – Andrew Pringle of Alemore; then Thomas Miller of Glenlee

Judiciary 
 Lord President of the Court of Session – Lord Glendoick
 Lord Justice General – Lord Ilay
 Lord Justice Clerk – Lord Tinwald

Events 
 13 September – Battle of the Plains of Abraham (Seven Years' War): British forces, including the 78th Fraser Highlanders, defeat those of the French to take Quebec City.
 September–October – Benjamin Franklin visits Scotland.
 87th Regiment of Foot (Keith's Highlanders) raised at Perth and sent to Germany.
 Dumfries House, designed by Robert Adam, completed.
 David Erskine establishes his own legal practice in Edinburgh, origins of the partnership Dundas & Wilson.
 The Carron Company establishes its ironworks at Falkirk.

Births 
 25 January – Robert Burns, national poet of Scotland (died 1796)
 5 March – John Jamieson, Secession minister and lexicographer (died 1838)
 26 March – John Mayne, printer, journalist and poet (died 1836 in London)
 29 March – Alexander Chalmers, biographer and editor (died 1834 in London)
 4 May (baptism) – Isabella Kelly, novelist and poet (died 1857 in London)
 7 May – John Beugo, engraver (died 1841)
 22 June – John Gilchrist, Indologist and surgeon (died 1841 in Paris)
 22 September – William Playfair, political economist (died 1823 in London)
 Aeneas Chisholm, Roman Catholic Vicar Apostolic of the Highland District (died 1818)
 Approximate date – Anne Rankine, innkeeper and possible muse of Robert Burns (died 1843)

Deaths 
 20 January – James Fergusson, Lord Kilkerran, judge (born 1688)
 11 March – John Forbes, British Army general (born 1707; died in Philadelphia)
 7 August – John Kennedy, 8th Earl of Cassilis (born 1700)

Publications 
 William Robertson – The History of Scotland During the Reigns of Queen Mary and of King James
 Adam Smith – The Theory of Moral Sentiments, embodying some of his Glasgow lectures

See also 

 Timeline of Scottish history

References 

 
Years of the 18th century in Scotland
Scotland
1750s in Scotland